Mistress of the Mountains (Italian: Gente così) is a 1950 Italian drama film directed by Fernando Cerchio and starring Vivi Gioi, Adriano Rimoldi and Camillo Pilotto.

Plot 
In a small town in upper Lombardy near the Swiss border, smuggling is considered legal and Don Candido intervenes in the endless discussions on business, trying to restore peace. A new elementary teacher arrives in the village, a woman with modern ideas who comes into conflict with the mentality of the inhabitants of the village. During a difficult construction of the dam, a smuggler arrives with whom the young teacher falls in love. When the young man flees to Milan, the woman follows him, only to turn back when she realizes she is pregnant. Surprised by the financial police, the smuggler falls into a ravine. Don Candido just has time to unite them in marriage, just before the young man dies.

Cast
 Vivi Gioi as Teresa, la maestrina  
 Adriano Rimoldi as Giàn, il contrabbandiere  
 Camillo Pilotto as Don Candido, arciprete  
 Renato De Carmine as Il biondino  
 Marisa Mari as La biondina  
 Saro Urzì as sindaco Giusà  
 Alberto Archetti as Un consigliere  
 Arrigo Peri as Segretario  
 Nicola La Torre as Consigliere III  
 Augusto Favi 
 Raffaello Niccoli as Vecchio Operaio  
 Raf Pindi as Nelli  
 Lena Zoppegni as La bidella  
 Egisto Olivieri as Consigliere II  
 Luigi Tosi 
 Giuliana Rivera

References

Bibliography 
 James Monaco. The Encyclopedia of Film. Perigee Books, 1991.

External links 
 
 Mistress of the Mountains at Variety Distribution

1950 drama films
Italian drama films
1950 films
1950s Italian-language films
Films directed by Fernando Cerchio
Films scored by Giovanni Fusco
Italian black-and-white films
1950s Italian films